is a Japanese manga series written and illustrated by Junta Shima. It was serialized in Line Corporation's Line Manga website from June 2018 to June 2022, with its chapters collected into seven tankōbon volumes. A television drama adaptation aired from April to May 2022. An anime adaptation has been announced.

Media

Manga
Written and illustrated by Junta Shima, Murai no Koi was serialized under the Gene Line label of Line Corporation's Line Manga website from June 18, 2018, to June 13, 2022. Media Factory has compiled the chapters into individual tankōbon volumes. Seven volumes were published from December 2018 to June 2022.

Volume list

Drama
A television drama adaptation was announced in March 2022, starring Hikaru Takahashi. It was directed by Taichi Imura, Aya Matsuki, and Daisuke Yamamoto, based on a screenplay by Kōhei Kiyasu. Keiko Matsumoto and Hiromi Matsushita served as the producers. The eight-episode series aired on TBS from April 6 to May 25, 2022.

Anime
An anime adaptation was announced in June 2022. The anime will be streamed worldwide on Disney+.

Reception
In 2019, the series ranked second in the Next Manga Awards in the web manga category.

References

External links
  
 

2022 Japanese television series debuts
2022 Japanese television series endings
Anime series based on manga
Japanese comedy webcomics
Manga adapted into television series
Media Factory manga
Romance webcomics
Romantic comedy anime and manga
Shōjo manga
TBS Television (Japan) dramas
Webcomics in print